Fundo Chifundo Mhura (born 9 October 1983 in Zomba, Malawi) is a Scottish amateur boxer best known for winning bronze at the 2006 European Amateur Boxing Championships at middleweight.

Career
Mhura left the African country when he was five months old and has lived in Scotland since.  He is a member of the Leith Victoria boxing club of Scotland.  The 6'1 fighter fought for his native country Malawi at welterweight (69/152 lbs) at the Commonwealth Games 2006 where he lost in the second round to Nigerian Olufemi Ajayi.

He moved up a division afterwards and became the first Scot to win a European boxing medal since Scott Harrison in 1996. 
He lost the semi-final controversially on points to Azeri Rahib Beylarov 18:23.

He has an eye condition which is threatening to end his amateur career.

In July 2013 Mhura was jailed for 6 years and 5 months for abducting and torturing a man for more than 20 hours over a sum that ran into the tens of thousands; he currently lives in Malawi.

External links
Commonwealth Bio
Euro results

1983 births
Living people
Scottish male boxers
Middleweight boxers